Crimestoppers Trust is an independent crime-fighting charitable organisation in the United Kingdom. Crimestoppers operates the 0800 555 111 telephone number, allowing people to call anonymously to pass on information about crime. People can also give information anonymously via an anonymous online form on the Crimestoppers website. Callers are not required to give their name or any personal information. Crimestoppers has more than 100 staff and almost 350 volunteers and has an income of more than £4.5M a year.

Most Wanted
In November 2005, Crimestoppers launched a Most Wanted section of its website, where members of the public can look at images of people currently wanted by UK law enforcement agencies.

Most Wanted is a UK-wide online database where individuals wanted by the police and other law enforcement bodies such as the National Crime Agency, HMRC, and the UK Border Force can be found and information passed on about them anonymously by the public.

As part of the Most Wanted section, the Unknowns Gallery was launched in February 2014. This allows law enforcement users to upload images of individuals that they require names for (often taken from e-fits or CCTV stills). With the gallery searchable by both crime type and location, this makes it easier for the public to put names to these faces without having to reveal their own identities.

Campaigns
Crimestoppers runs a large number of campaigns each year educating the public about different crime types and appealing for information. Examples of campaigns include:

‘Scratch and Sniff’ Cannabis Cultivation Campaign

Starting in 2013, the charity and police forces across the country distributed "scratch and sniff" cards to the public to educate and inform them about the signs to spot and the specific smell of cannabis when it is growing. The campaign was designed to target cultivation by criminal gangs so hot spot areas, as informed by police intelligence, were targeted by 17 police forces throughout England and Wales. Due to the campaign, information passed to Crimestoppers on cannabis cultivation contributed to new cannabis farms being discovered and a number of arrests.

Game of Fraud

Crime figures show a substantial rise in reported fraud, boosted by a rise in identity theft and online scams costing the UK economy £63m per year. To help tackle these crimes, the charity has created a Game of Fraud website, featuring a survey with information on a variety of frauds, including romance fraud, courier fraud and online shopping fraud. Through a series of short questions, the quiz identifies which fraud types members of the public may be most vulnerable to and gives a detailed description of how they may be targeted.

Human Trafficking

Crimestoppers asks the public to help prevent human trafficking by passing on anonymously any information they have, no matter how small, about forced labour exploitation. Human trafficking is the second most profitable crime type in the world, second only to drugs, with an annual trade value of around $32 billion. Hundreds of men, women and children are identified as potential victims of labour trafficking in the UK each year, and the figure is rising.

Catching UK criminals abroad
Crimestoppers works with partners including the National Crime Agency and the UK Border Agency to track down UK criminals that are believed to be on the run in Europe.

Operation Captura is Crimestoppers’ campaign that aims to track down UK criminals on the run in Spain. Spain has always been a popular place for UK criminals to hide, but in 2004 European Arrest Warrants came into effect, making it easier to extradite criminals. Operation Captura works by publicising the names and faces of wanted criminals who are believed to be in Spain, so people there can identify them and provide information as to their whereabouts.

In March 2010, Crimestoppers worked with the National Crime Agency, Meld Misdaad Anoniem and the Dutch Police to launch Operation Return. Operation Return aimed to track down six UK criminals that were believed to be on the run in the Netherlands. This list consisted of some of the UK's most dangerous criminals that were wanted for crimes that vary from drugs smuggling, the illegal sale of firearms, robbery, violence and rape. A second Operation Return appeal was made in Amsterdam in June 2011, a third in February 2014 and a fourth in March 2016.

The Operation Zygos campaign targets fugitives hiding in Cyprus. The first arrest was made within 48 hours of the campaign launch when a man wanted for sexual offences against a child was located. Among those caught were also Wayne Smith and Julie Skelding, who were wanted for causing death by dangerous driving and perverting the course of justice.

Fearless
In April 2010, Crimestoppers launched Fearless, a dedicated youth service for 11 to 16-year-olds. Fearless replaced ShadowCS, Crimestoppers’ original youth brand. Fearless aims to educate and empower young people with information and advice about crimes that might affect them personally, their friends or their family. It includes an option for young people to pass on information about crime anonymously via an online form.

Regional activities 
Crimestoppers works at a grassroots level across the UK. Supported by a volunteer network, regional teams work alongside local police, businesses and other charities, launching campaigns and events to help make communities safer places to live.

Rewards
Crimestoppers pays rewards for information that directly leads to an arrest. The amount paid can range between £50 and £1,000, depending on the severity of the crime and the significance of the information being communicated. They do not pay rewards for the recovery of stolen property. An individual's anonymity is never compromised by claiming a reward as, when an individual passes information on to Crimestoppers, they can request a special code. If that individual wants to check whether they are eligible for a reward, they are requested to call Crimestoppers again at a later date with the code they were originally issued with. Crimestoppers then inform the caller whether they are eligible for a reward. If they are, the caller can choose a bank branch and a date when they would like to collect the money. The caller then goes to the bank branch, provides them with the code and is issued with the cash reward.

History

Origins in USA and Norfolk 

Crimestoppers originated in Albuquerque, USA in 1976, when a young man was shot dead during a robbery at a filling station, and having made little headway in finding the perpetrator, police decided to set up an anonymous phone line for witnesses to come forward with information. Within 72 hours, arrests were made, but what amazed the New Mexico police was the number of people giving information on other, unrelated crimes. So the Crimestoppers concept was born.

Six years later, Detective Inspector Mike Cole from Norfolk Constabulary, learned about the scheme on a police visit to Peoria, in Illinois. He was impressed with how information was given anonymously, and also how callers giving information that led to an arrest put themselves in line for a reward payment from money donated by local businesses.

On his return to Great Yarmouth, Mike submitted a report to his chief superintendent and the chief constable, who gave their approval for a Norfolk scheme. However, it was by chance that Jim Carter, the manager of the local Woolworths, subsequently received a letter from Chief Superintendent Peter Howse asking for support. When Jim followed up on this letter and learnt about the Crimestoppers scheme, he saw it as a good opportunity to get the community involved in crime-fighting.

Other areas around the UK also learned of Crimestoppers and took it up around this time but there was no national, co-ordinated approach.

National operation 
In 1985, PC Keith Blakelock was murdered during the riots at the Broadwater Farm Estate in London and the police appealed for information, stating that people knew who had been responsible but were frightened of coming forward.

Businessman Michael Ashcroft (later Lord Ashcroft) offered to provide the police with money for a reward to encourage somebody to come forward with information. This led to discussions with the Commissioner of the Metropolitan Police, resulting in Ashcroft founding the establishment of a national operation in the UK in January 1988. He set up the charity and, together with some business colleagues who were also concerned about the rise in violent crime, they funded the UK operation calling it the Community Action Trust.

In many ITV regions, such as HTV, Granada, Thames and Tyne-Tees, appeals were broadcast at various times of the day but usually aired at around 15:25 or 18:25 on weekdays and after the live First Division Football match on Sundays from 1992 to the early 2000s when appeals were shown less on TV.  A moving mouth montage on a grey background with the words Crime (in red) and Stoppers (in white) plus a theme composed by Rupert Gregson-Williams opened the appeal which would then feature a brief police reconstruction before showing the 0800 555 111 appeal telephone number.

The charity was renamed the Crimestoppers Trust in 1995; by then it had expanded to cover the whole of the UK as the other Crimestoppers’ schemes foundered or were encompassed within the charity. Initially, the administrative organisation was based on ITV regions, but the best model proved to be local county-based committees working in partnership with single police forces. The roll-out of this structure continues; there are now 44 volunteer committees across the UK.

Ashcroft has been Chairman of the Trustees of Crimestoppers for the last 20 years and remains a core donor to the charity.

Website security flaws 
For most of 2015 the Crimestoppers online reporting website, touted as secure and anonymous, received an "F" rating in industry standard security tests, using obsolete 20-year-old protocols that made it fundamentally insecure. Crimestoppers fixed these problems in November 2015, ahead of the National Crime Agency and Independent Police Complaints Commission, which still had unfixed problems of the same magnitude at that date.

Results 
According to their own statistics, the promise of anonymity has never been broken. As a result of the information given to Crimestoppers:

Nearly 134,000 arrests and charges have been made since 1988.
Over 1.6 million actionable calls have been received since 1988.
More than £131 million of stolen goods has been recovered since 1988.
More than £326 million of drugs have been seized since 1988.
Around 14 people are arrested every day as a result of information given to Crimestoppers.
At least 23% of all information received helps the police deliver an outcome, from arresting someone to preventing a crime.

References

External links 
Crimestoppers UK
Fearless
Crimestoppers Most Wanted

Law enforcement in the United Kingdom
Charities based in London
UK